The Aptian extinction was an extinction event of the early Cretaceous Period. It is dated to c. 116 or 117 million years ago, in the middle of the Aptian stage of the geological time scale, and has sometimes been termed the mid-Aptian extinction event as a result.

It is classified as a minor extinction event, rather than a major event like the famous Cretaceous–Paleogene extinction event that brought about the end of the "age of dinosaurs" and the Mesozoic Era. The Aptian event is most readily detected among marine rather than terrestrial fossil deposits. Nonetheless, "From a palaeobotanical perspective, the Aptian Extinction Event is an episode of importance, deserving a higher status among other minor events."

The Aptian event may have been causally connected with the Rahjamal Traps volcanism episode in the Bengal region of India, associated with the Kerguelen hotspot of volcanic activity. (At the time in question, c. 116–117 Ma, India was located in the southern Indian Ocean; plate tectonics had not yet moved the Indian landmass into its present position.)
Note that the stegosaur group of dinosaurs went extinct around this time. Wuerhosaurus, probably the last of the stegosaurs, lived during this time. The tritylodonts, the last surviving relatives (but not members) of the mammals went extinct around this time too. These extinctions may be associated with this event.

References

Early Cretaceous extinctions
Extinction events
Aptian